HMS Unicorn is a surviving sailing frigate of the successful Leda class, although the original design had been modified by the time that the Unicorn was built, to incorporate a circular stern and "small-timber" system of construction. Listed as part of the National Historic Fleet, Unicorn is now a museum ship in Dundee, Scotland, United Kingdom. She is the oldest ship in Scotland, one of the oldest ships in the world, and one of the last intact warships from the age of sail.

History 

HMS Unicorn was built in peacetime at Chatham Dockyard, Kent and launched in 1824. This was a transitional period for shipbuilding, as suitable timber was becoming more difficult to obtain, and iron was increasingly available. Under the direction of Sir Robert Seppings, then Surveyor of the Royal Navy, Unicorn was built with diagonal riders made with iron straps and iron "knees" that strengthened the hull.

As Unicorn was built shortly after the naval wars against Napoleon ended, she was never rigged; she only went to sea for the voyage from Chatham to Dundee, during which she was under tow. A superstructure was built over her main deck and she was laid up "in ordinary", serving as a hulk and a depot ship for most of the next 140 years. Her lack of active duty left her timbers well preserved, and in the 1960s steps were initiated to convert her to a museum ship. The roof that covers her upper deck is thought to be original, although portions of it were removed in the 1970s, leading conservators to replace the foc'sle roof.

Unicorn'''s sister ship HMS Trincomalee has been restored and is the centrepiece of the National Museum of the Royal Navy based in Hartlepool.

Some steps were taken to restore Unicorn.

In April 2019 the Unicorn Preservation Society, whose patron is Anne, Princess Royal, received a National Lottery Resilient Heritage Fund Grant in the amount of £28,900.

In March 2021 the frigate was surveyed; most of the planking was found to be in a very poor state, with even newer planking (from the 1850s) also deteriorated. However, according to one of the restorers, of all the old ships of this type, "this one is probably the most original, certainly inside ... Virtually all of what you see dates back to the day it was built and it hasn't been largely rebuilt over that time."

It was planned to move the ship to the nearby East Graving Dock for conservation work (Operation Safe Haven), and ultimately set up a maritime heritage centre for the ship. The Unicorn Preservation Society was seeking gifts of large oaks to replace the planking.

 Notes 

References

Footnotes
 David Lyon and Rif Winfield (2004), The Sail and Steam Navy List: All the Ships of the Royal Navy 1815-1889. Chatham Publishing. .

External links
 HMS Unicorn - official site
 HMS Unicorn - webpage, National Historic Ships''
 The "Leda"-class frigate

Frigates of the Royal Navy
Museum ships in the United Kingdom
Tall ships of the United Kingdom
Ships built in Chatham
1824 ships
Leda-class frigates
Museums in Dundee
Ships and vessels of the National Historic Fleet